The Myasishchev M-101T is a Russian business class aircraft, designed by Myasishchev and built by Sokol. The aircraft was first flown on 31 March 1995.

Operators
 
 Dexter Air Taxi (3 aircraft).
 3 more aircraft operated by Buguruslansk Civil Aviation School.
1 aircraft RA15106, was demonstrated in 2004 in South Africa by ROSAVIA and flown at multiple airshows in South Africa. These demonstrations were flown by Yurij Polyakov and South African born Andrew Cross. The project generated a lot of interest but did not sell because the asking price was too high. When the project ended the aircraft was ferried back to Russia by Yurij Polyakov.

Specifications

See also

References

Further reading
 Taylor, Michael J.H. Brassey's World Aircraft & Systems Directory 1999/2000. London:Brassey's, 1999. .

External links

 Class Struggle

M-101T
1990s Soviet and Russian business aircraft
Single-engined tractor aircraft
Single-engined turboprop aircraft
Low-wing aircraft
Aircraft first flown in 1995